Thaumatichthys binghami is a species of wolftrap angler known from the western central Atlantic Ocean, where it occurs at a depth of . This species is similar to T. axeli, except that its esca bears 2–3 pairs of lateral lobes that are elongated into tapering filaments in the largest individuals, and the uppermost medial appendage on the esca is finger-like and tapering.

References
 

Thaumatichthyidae
Fish of the Atlantic Ocean
Fish described in 1927
Taxa named by Albert Eide Parr